Janet Godsell (born March 1971) is professor of operations and supply chain strategy at the University of Warwick. She was formerly a senior lecturer at Cranfield University School of Management. Before that she worked at ICI, Astra Zeneca, and Dyson. She is a graduate of Cranfield University and a chartered engineer and member of the Institution of Mechanical Engineers. She is a member of the Made Smarter Expert Panel and an advocate of supply chain integration and of education in STEM subjects in schools.

References

External links 

Living people
1971 births
Academics of the University of Warwick
Alumni of Cranfield University
British women academics
Imperial Chemical Industries people
AstraZeneca people
Supply chain management
British women engineers